I-15 was a Japanese B1 type submarine. She was completed at Kure Naval Arsenal on September 30, 1940, whereupon she entered into service with the Imperial Japanese Navy. Her first and only commanding officer was Commander Nobuo Ishikawa. I-15 operated off the north coast of Oahu during the raid on Pearl Harbor. Her second wartime patrol, in May and June 1942, took her to the Aleutians, where she conducted reconnaissance of several islands. I-15s third and final patrol took place from August to November 1942, when she operated in the Solomon Islands in the South Pacific, supporting the Japanese efforts to hold Guadalcanal. One source (Morison) suggests that I-15 hit the battleship  with a torpedo on September 15, 1942. On November 10, 1942, a U.S. ex-destroyer (modified to a fast minesweeper), sank I-15 at Cape Recherche, San Cristóbal, with all hands lost.
Commander Ishikawa was promoted to the rank of Captain posthumously. On December 14, 1942, more than one month after I-15 was sunk,  sank an unknown submarine which it misidentified as the I-15.

Notes

Sources
 Hackett, Bob & Kingsepp, Sander.  HIJMS Submarine I-15: Tabular Record of Movement.  http://www.combinedfleet.com/I-15.htm.  Retrieved on March 15, 2009.

 Morison, Samuel Eliot.  The Struggle for Guadalcanal, pp. 131–34, 233.  Volume 5 of The History of United States Naval Operations in World War II (1949).  Edison, NJ: Castle Books, 2001.
 .

Type B1 submarines
Ships built by Kure Naval Arsenal
1939 ships
World War II submarines of Japan
Ships of the Aleutian Islands campaign
Japanese submarines lost during World War II
Ships lost with all hands
Maritime incidents in November 1942
World War II shipwrecks in the Pacific Ocean